The Roman Catholic Archdiocese of Kaga-Bandoro is a diocese in Kaga-Bandoro in the ecclesiastical province of Bangui in the Central African Republic.

History
The diocese was established on June 28, 1997, from Metropolitan Archdiocese of Bangui. The territory of the diocese was 95,000 km2 in extent. In 2005 the area had a reported population of 230,420 people, of whom 50,347 (25%) were Catholics. The diocese was to comprise 8 parishes, with 17 priests, 14 Sisters, 7 major seminarians, 114 minor seminarians, and 400 catechists.

Special churches
The cathedral is the Cathedral of St. Therese of the Child Jesus in Kaga-Bandoro.

Bishops
 Bishops of Kaga-Bandoro (Roman rite), in reverse chronological order
 Bishop Zbigniew Tadeusz Kusy, O.F.M. (since September 27, 2015)
 Bishop Albert Vanbuel, S.D.B. (July 16, 2005 - September 27, 2015)
 Bishop François-Xavier Yombandje (June 28, 1997 – April 3, 2004), appointed Bishop of Bossangoa

Coadjutor bishop
Zbigniew Tadeusz Kusy, O.F.M. (2014-2015)

See also
Roman Catholicism in the Central African Republic

Sources
 GCatholic.org

References

Kaga-Bandoro
Kaga-Bandoro
Christian organizations established in 1997
Roman Catholic dioceses and prelatures established in the 20th century
Nana-Grébizi